Taygetis fulginia is a species of butterfly of the family Nymphalidae.

Taxonomy
The species was previously considered a synonym of Taygetis ypthima, but morphological study revealed its specific status and indicates closer relationship with Taygetis rectifascia and Taygetis servius.

References

Butterflies described in 1922
Euptychiina
Fauna of Brazil
Nymphalidae of South America